Neil Joseph Morrison (11 January 1938 – 19 September 2007) was a New Zealand politician of the Social Credit Party.

Political career

During the 1984 election campaign, Hunt coined the unflattering term "Skoda brigade and Crimplene suit contingent" for Social Credit supporters after losing to Morrison. Gary Knapp retained , but the party leader Bruce Beetham lost his Rangitikei seat. Soon after being elected he began advocating to change the name of the Social Credit Party to the New Zealand Democratic Party in an effort to rejuvenate following a huge drop in support between the 1981 and 1984 elections.

In 1986 Beetham lost the leadership of the party to Morrison. On the night he was elected, the new leader implied in a TV interview that the Social Credit national dividend policy was out of date and would be dropped. This was in response to a question from the interviewer, which he might not have listened to carefully. The next day when Beetham said he was considering resigning because the new leadership was rejecting basic Social Credit philosophy, Morrison publicly retracted his comment and affirmed that the national dividend would remain an important part of Social Credit policy.

In the  Morrison was defeated by National candidate Maurice Williamson, and Knapp was defeated by another National candidate. Morrison later left the Social Credit Party and instead joined ACT New Zealand where he found himself together with Hunt who had joined the party too. When appearing together at the inaugural ACT conference in 1994 Morrison acknowledged that many Social Creditors liked crimplene and one of his branch members drove a Skoda.

He was a Manukau City Councillor, and about to run for re-election when he died in 2007.

Notes

References

New Zealand Herald obituary

1938 births
2007 deaths
Social Credit Party (New Zealand) MPs
Leaders of political parties in New Zealand
Members of the New Zealand House of Representatives
New Zealand MPs for Auckland electorates
Unsuccessful candidates in the 1987 New Zealand general election
Unsuccessful candidates in the 1981 New Zealand general election
ACT New Zealand politicians
Manukau City Councillors